Listriolobus is a genus of polychaetes belonging to the family Echiuridae.

The genus has almost cosmopolitan distribution.

Species:

Listriolobus bahamensis 
Listriolobus brevirostris 
Listriolobus capensis 
Listriolobus hexamyotus 
Listriolobus pelodes 
Listriolobus sorbillans

References

Annelids